Tantsi is an album by the band Vopli Vidopliassova and was released in 1989 on Fonograf. It is a live recording of a rehearsal for the concert they played at the "Rock Against Stalinism" festival in Kharkiv.

Tracks 2 and 11 later became Borshch songs. Track 1 was later released on Kraina Mriy. Tracks 3, 4 and 6 ended up on Hvyli Amura. Tracks 5, 10 and 14 were released on Muzika. Tracks 7, 9 and 12-14 were released on Buly denky. Track 8 made its way to Fayno.

The album was featured in the book 100 magnitoalbomov sovetskogo roka.

"Banka", an outtake from the sessions, was re-titled "Laznya" and released as a single in early 2019.

Track list

References

External links 
 Tantsi at Discogs

1989 albums
Vopli Vidopliassova albums